MTV Unplugged 2.0 is a live album released by American emo band Dashboard Confessional on 17 December 2002 through Vagrant. This CD/DVD package is the band's first live album. The band is also the first non-Platinum selling artist to be on MTV Unplugged. "Screaming Infidelities" was released as a single.

Songs
The songs featured on this album are slightly changed and are more up-beat versions of the songs from Dashboard Confessional's previous albums, The Swiss Army Romance and The Places You Have Come to Fear the Most and their So Impossible EP.

This is the first time Dashboard Confessional performs the tracks "Remember to Breathe", "The Sharp Hint of New Tears, "So Impossible", "Turpentine Chaser", "Living in Your Letters", "For You to Notice" and "Hands Down" as a full band unlike the ones on their original albums which featured only Chris Carrabba, who is sometimes accompanied by John Lefler.

Reception

MTV Unplugged 2.0 sold 34,000 copies in its first week, and 149,000 copies by August 2003. After a few months, RIAA certified the album Platinum, indicating shipment of between 100,000 and 200,000 units, as it is considered a long-form video. The album is the first one to have peaked at #1 on the Top Heatseekers chart and the Top Independent Albums chart. The album peaked at #111 on the Billboard 200.

Track listing
All songs written by Chris Carrabba.

"The Swiss Army Romance" – 3:08
"The Best Deceptions" – 4:31
"Remember to Breathe" – 3:48
"The Good Fight" – 2:30
"The Sharp Hint of New Tears" – 2:54
"So Impossible" – 3:03
"The Places You Have Come to Fear the Most" – 3:11
"Turpentine Chaser" – 3:46
"Living in Your Letters" – 4:31
"For You to Notice" – 4:53
"The Brilliant Dance" – 3:18
"Screaming Infidelities" – 3:44
"Saints and Sailors" – 2:33
"Again I Go Unnoticed" – 2:43
"Hands Down" – 3:56

Personnel
Personnel per booklet.

Dashboard Confessional
 Chris Carrabba – vocals, guitar
 Johnny Lefler – guitar, piano
 Dan Bonebrake – bass
 Mike Marsh – drums

DVD credits
 Alex Coletti – producer, surround sound mixing
 Adam Blackburn – recording
 John Harris – mixing
 Max Feldman – mixing
 Chris Shaw – remixing

CD credits
 Chris Shaw – mixing
 Steve Sisco – assistant
 Alex Coletti –  additional production
 Scott Gries – photography
 Keath Moon – design

Chart performance

References

External links
Listen to samples of the album

Dashboard Confessional live albums
MTV Unplugged albums
2002 live albums
Vagrant Records live albums